This is a list of mammals observed in the U.S. state of Utah.

Abert's squirrel (Sciurus aberti)
Allen's big-eared bat (Idionycteris phyllotis)
American badger (Taxidea taxus)
American bison (Bison bison)
American black bear (Ursus americanus)
American ermine (Mustela richardsonii)
American pika (Ochotona princeps)
American red squirrel (Tamiasciurus hudsonicus)
American water shrew (Sorex palustris)
Arizona woodrat (Neotoma devia)
American mink (Neogale vison)
Belding's ground squirrel (Urocitellus beldingi)
Big brown bat (Eptesicus fuscus)
Big free-tailed bat (Nyctinomops macrotis)
Black rat (Rattus rattus) introduced
Black-footed ferret (Mustela nigripes)
Black-tailed jackrabbit (Lepus californicus)
Bobcat (Lynx rufus)
Botta's pocket gopher (Thomomys bottae)
Grizzly bear (Ursus arctos horribilis) extirpated
Brown rat (Rattus norvegicus) introduced
Brush mouse (Peromyscus boylii)
Bushy-tailed woodrat (Neotoma cinerea)
Cactus mouse (Peromyscus eremicus)
California myotis (Myotis californicus)
Canada lynx (Lynx canadensis)
Canyon mouse (Peromyscus crinitus)
Chisel-toothed kangaroo rat (Dipodomys microps)
Cinereus shrew (Sorex cinereus)
Cliff chipmunk (Neotamias dorsalis)
Cougar (Puma concolor)
Coyote (Canis latrans)
Crawford's gray shrew (Notiosorex crawfordi)
Dark kangaroo mouse (Microdipodops megacephalus)
Desert bighorn sheep (Ovis canadensis nelsoni)
Desert cottontail (Sylvilagus audubonii)
Desert kangaroo rat (Dipodomys deserti)
Desert pocket mouse (Chaetodipus penicillatus)
Desert woodrat (Neotoma lepida)
Dwarf shrew (Sorex nanus)
Elk (Cervus canadensis)
Fringed myotis (Myotis thysanodes)
Golden-mantled ground squirrel (Callospermophilus lateralis)
Gray fox (Urocyon cinereoargenteus)
Gray wolf (Canis lupus) extirpated (sightings along the Wyoming border occur)
Great Basin pocket mouse (Perognathus parvus)
Hoary bat (Lasiurus cinereus)
House mouse (Mus musculus) introduced
Kit fox (Vulpes macrotis)
Least chipmunk (Neotamias minimus)
Little brown bat (Myotis lucifugus)
Long-eared myotis (Myotis evotis)
Long-legged myotis (Myotis volans)
Long-tailed vole (Microtus longicaudus)
Long-tailed weasel (Neogale frenata)
Meadow vole (Microtus pennsylvanicus)
Mexican free-tailed bat (Tadarida brasiliensis)
Montane shrew (Sorex monticolus)
Montane vole (Microtus montanus)
Moose (Alces alces)
Mountain cottontail (Sylvilagus nuttallii)
Mountain goat (Oreamnos americanus) introduced
Mule deer (Odocoileus hemionus)
Muskrat (Ondatra zibethicus)
North American beaver (Castor canadensis)
North American porcupine (Erethizon dorsatum)
North American river otter (Lontra canadensis)
Northern flying squirrel (Glaucomys sabrinus)
Northern grasshopper mouse (Onychomys leucogaster)
Northern pocket gopher (Thomomys talpoides)
Ord's kangaroo rat (Dipodomys ordii)
Pacific marten (Martes caurina)
Pinyon mouse (Peromyscus truei)
Piute ground squirrel (Urocitellus mollis)
Pronghorn (Antilocapra americana)
Raccoon (Procyon lotor)
Red fox (Vulpes vulpes)
Ring-tailed cat (Bassariscus astutus)
Rock squirrel (Otospermophilus variegatus)
Rocky Mountain bighorn sheep (Ovis canadensis canadensis)
Silver-haired bat (Lasionycteris noctivagans)
Snowshoe hare (Lepus americanus)
Southern red-backed vole (Clethrionomys gapperi)
Spotted bat (Euderma maculatum)
Striped skunk (Mephitis mephitis)
Townsend's big-eared bat (Corynorhinus townsendii)
Uinta chipmunk (Neotamias umbrinus)
Uinta ground squirrel (Urocitellus armatus)
Utah prairie dog (Cynomys parvidens)
Vagrant shrew (Sorex vagrans)
Water vole (Microtus richardsoni)
Western deer mouse (Peromyscus sonoriensis)
Western harvest mouse (Reithrodontomys megalotis)
Western heather vole (Phenacomys intermedius)
Western jumping mouse (Zapus princeps)
Western small-footed bat (Myotis ciliolabrum)
Western spotted skunk (Spilogale gracilis)
White-tailed antelope squirrel (Ammospermophilus leucurus)
White-tailed deer (Odocoileus virginianus)
White-tailed jackrabbit (Lepus townsendii)
Wolverine (Gulo gulo) vagrant
Yellow-bellied marmot (Marmota flaviventris)

References

Mammals
Utah